12 String Guitar! Vol. 2 is the second album by The Folkswingers, released in 1963 on the World Pacific record label. The album contains instrumental versions of popular folk songs, featuring Glen Campbell playing a 12-string guitar.

Track listing

Personnel
Glen Campbell – 12 string guitar
Donavan Cotton – drums
Keith Mitchell – bass
James E. Bond – bass
Billy Ray Lathum – banjo

Production
Producer – Jim Dickson

External links
[ The Folkswingers] at Allmusic
 

Glen Campbell albums
1963 albums
World Pacific Records albums
Covers albums
Instrumental albums